Ssshhhh... Koi Hai ( "Ssshhhh... Someone's there") is an Indian horror thriller television anthology series created by Cinevistaas Limited and Contiloe Entertainment for Star Plus. The first season was created by them together, while later seasons were only created by Abhimanyu Raj Singh and were aired on Star Plus' sister channel Star One. The series which premiered on 27 July 2001, ran for three seasons ending on 16 May 2010.

Mamik Singh, Salil Ankola, Neha Devi Singh, Jiten Lalwani,Alex Upadhyay, Shahbaz Khan, Gufi Paintal, Shonali Malhotra, Reshma Khan, KK Goswami, Shiva Rindani, Vindu Dara Singh, Ronit Roy, Mac Mohan, Sunil Grover, Murali Sharma, Hrishikesh Pandey, Kamya Panjabi, Girish Jain and others have starred in the series. Shakti Anand, Indian TV actor, also worked in the first season and two episodes of the second season.

Plot

Season 1 (2001–2004)
Initial episodes were the stories related from every aspect of horror and thrillers and in later episodes a ghostbuster was introduced named Vikraal played by Mamik Singh, who captures ghosts. Later again, the show takes turn over after the return of Mayakaal, who was the most powerful wizard and captured Vikraal. Guru Satyacharya observed that Vikraal could not handle the situation alone, and therefore decided to summon Mritunjay's daughter Bijli and Captain Kishan to help Vikraal. These three defeated Mayakaal. These ghostbusters' mission was to get rid of all the ghosts and evil spirits in the world. These three ghost-busters were called the Trikaal, who were always ready to fight evil powers. The Show used to run every Friday 10:00pm, Later changed to 10:30pm on Star Plus prime Weekand. Later, the show had a re-run at Star Utsav which aired during 2008 at 10:00pm every Saturday and Sunday.

Season 2 (2006–2009)
The second season was titled Sssshhh... Phir Koi Hai, ( Sssshhh... Someone's again there) which was a weekly series, airing Friday and Saturday nights. On 6 July 2007, a special series named Sssshhh... Phir Koi Hai – Aryaamann of four episodes was telecast. In this series, Rahil Azam plays the role of Aryaamann as the ghost buster. His mission was to cast away all negative powers in the world. This special series ended on 27 July 2007.

In December 2007, the show returned with a biweekly telecast, i.e. Friday and Saturday, each story being split into two episodes. In January 2009, the format of the series was changed. Each story was made to run for eight weeks. One of them was Intezar. The main cast included Gautam Rode, Divyanka Tripathi and Amrapali Gupta. The story was about two lovers Mohan and Radhika. Mohan was the son of a Thakur in Kishangarh who had gone abroad for studies. He comes back and meets Ambika (a witch). When he reaches his home, he meets Radhika (his lover). Ambika was hired by Dashrath Singh, a rival of Mohan's father. He wanted all of his property. Ambika plays such a game that Mohan and Radhika start disbelieving each other. Ambika kills the fathers of Mohan and Radhika, and the blame is pinned on Mohan and Radhika respectively. Mohan believes that Radhika killed his father and Radhika believes that Mohan killed her father. Ambika tricks Mohan and snatches all of his property, giving it to Dashrath Singh. Ambika wanted Mohan for her purpose but she start loving him. Mohan's mother asks Mohan to marry Ambika. At this time, Radhika gets to know the truth of Ambika and reveals the truth to Mohan. Ambika tricks Radhika and kills her. Before killing her, she makes her believe that Mohan killed her. After hearing about Radhika's death, Mohan jumps from a cliff.

A second janam (rebirth) is shown in which Mohan is born as Madhav and Radhika is born Meera, while Ambika just changes her name from Ambika to Kalika. Madhav is an engineer who has come to Kishangarh for making a dam. He gets flashes of his previous birth. He then meets Kalika and Kalika narrates her the story of Mohan, Radhika and Ambika in which she makes Madhav believe that Radhika was the witch but Madhav having flashes and knowing a little bit of truth doesn't believe her. Meera is the daughter of Durgadevi, the owner of the haveli (Dashrath Singh's daughter-in-law). She often gets possessed by the spirit of Radhika and forgets herself. Both of them don't know that they are reborn as Mohan and Radhika. One day both of them get to know the truth but the truth Meera learned it is a lie. She thinks that Mohan killed her. She then meets Madhav and tried to kill him but something stops her. Madhav tells her the real and they both unite. Madhav (Mohan) and Meera (Radhika) kill Ambika and they both get married at the end of the drama.

Season 3 (2010)
Sssshhh... Phir Koi Hai 3 aired on Friday and Saturday evenings, later shifting to every Saturday and Sunday on 10 April 2010. This season had only one story.

The season introduces a very old story set in the past. It had also introduced a prophecy that was made centuries ago. It's the story of two brothers (Ajinkya and Veer), whose lives are destined to intertwine. Ajinkya has been in search of his mother for the past twenty years. Ajinkya and Veer join hands only to realize eventually they are the lost brothers – but with completely different motives. The powerful demon king – Vikrant destroys the much feared demon-slayer – Saarthak. He tries to destroy his two sons also. Ajinkya manages to find his mother but is shocked to know she had never transformed. He manages to kill Vikrant, but that wouldn't be the end of him. He enters Vayika's body, who is injured in a struggle and in order to finish Vikrant completely, ends up killing Vayika.

Cast

Season 1

Main
 Mamik Singh (2002–2003) as Vikraal and Vijaykaal (Vikraal's Father), the ghostbuster.
 Salil Ankola (2003–2004) as Vikraal and the leader of the Trikaal force.
 Shonali Malhotra (2002–2003)/Deepika Sharma (2003)/Noopur Joshi (2003)/Reshma Khan (2003–2004) as Lily, an assistant of Vikraal, later Trikaal's assistant. She is secretly in love with Vikraal. 
 KK Goswami as Gabroo (2002–2004), A dwarf ghost, also an assistant of Vikraal and later Trikaal's assistant. Gabroo has feelings for Lily.
 Shakti Anand (2002–2003) / Manav Gohil (2003) / Jiten Lalwani (2003–2004) as Captain Kishan, a forest officer and a very good friend of Vikraal. He is also a former-classmate of Vikraal. Later, Captain Kishan had joined the Trikaal force.
 Tarana Raja (2003) / Aditi Pratap (2003-2004) as Kareena. Captain Kishan's dear friend.
 Neha Devi Singh as Sameera/Bijli, the ghostbuster, one of the three members of the Trikaal force. She is the daughter of Mritunjay. (2003–2004).
 Prabhat Bhattacharya as Naqaab, Trikaal's secret agent (2004).
 Shahbaz Khan as Shakaal/Mayakaal (2002–2004)
 Goolistan Gandhi as Mrs. Mistry, Sameera's (Bijli) boss. The owner of the ladies' parlour.
 Rishi Kapoor as Pawan, Sameera's (Bijli) close friend.
 Murali Sharma as Murli/Mrityukaal (2003-2004).
 Vishnu Sharma as Guru Satyacharya (2002–2004)
 Nawab Shah as Drohkaal, a rogue ghostbuster and a former friend of Vikraal (2002–2003).
 Tom Alter as Mritunjay and in various characters (2001–2004)
 Mukesh Jadhav as Koeta (2002–2004)
 Namrata Thapa as various characters (2002–2003)
 Neha Pendse as Madhuri, Nemolika, in various characters (2001–2003)
 Simple Kaul in various characters (2003–2004)
 Ritu Seth as various characters (2001–2004)
 Kamya Panjabi as various characters (2001–2004)
 Parmeet Sethi as Ghost (2001)
 Deepshikha Nagpal as Zehreena, Zaalima, in various characters (2001–2004)
 Manini Mishra as various characters
 Malini Kapoor as various characters (2001)
 Nigaar Khan as Sarr Katika, Sonika
 Vindu Dara Singh as Senapati Sangram Singh, Zaal/various characters
 Lalit Parimoo as various characters
 Gufi Paintal as various characters

Recurring

 Mamik Singh as Tarun in "Joker" (Episode 5); as Sunny in "Jalwa" (Episode 16).
 Yashpal Sharma as Jaspal in "Vidyut" (Episode 1). 
 Irrfan Khan as Amar in "Mumkin" (Episode 9) 
 Paintal as Madhav in "Bhediya" (Episode 3); as the archeologist in "Khoj" [Episode 15]. 
 Rahil Azam as Mandaar in "Raakh" (Episode 22)
 Tina Parekh as Divya in "Vidyut" (Episode 1).
Himani Shivpuri as Maaya in "Jazeera" (Episode 31).
 Neha Dhupia as Archana in "Woh Kaun Thi" (Episode 14).
 Tanaaz Irani as (Shapeshifting spirit) Gulaab in "Vikraal Ka Sangharsh" and "Vikraal Aur Karamati Coat" (Episode 78 and Episode 82)
 Ravi Kishan as Jalnath in "Bijli Aur Jalikaa" (146) and "Vikraal Aur Jalnath" (Episode 147).
 Ronit Roy as Guddu in "Jalwa" (Episode 16); as Bosco in "GDA 2551 (Episode 26)"; as Inspector in "Meaw" (Episode 48).
 Shruti Seth as Anjali in "Khel Khel Mein" (Episode 13); as Debby in "GDA 2551" (Episode 26).
 Kamya Panjabi as Nisha in "Shart" (Episode 17)/as Vandana in "Rang Barse" (Episode 36) / as Lilliput ki Rani in "Vikraal Lilliput Ki Nagri Mein" (Episode 75)/ as Jyoti in "Vikraal Adhoori Duniya Mai" (Episode 89), "Vikraal Aur Gorganza" (Episode 90) and "Vikraal Aur Time Machine" (Episode 91).
 Parmeet Sethi as Ghost in "Shart" (Episode 17).
 Meghna Kothari as Mehek in "Painter" (Episode 11).
 Hrishikesh Pandey as Rahul Sharma in "Shart" (Episode 17) / Senapati Adityavardhan in "Mrityudand" (Episode 39).
 Chetan Hansraj as Raja Saab / Pahadi Raja in "Doosri Dulhan" (Episode 18)/ Michael in "Ghar" (Episode 28)/ Sotya in "Samandar" (Episode 35)/ Benu in "Vikraal Aur Bhayanak Bansuri" (Episode 59)/ Dracula in "Vikraal Aur Dracula : Part 1 – Part 3" (Episode 86,87,88).
Pradeep Rawat as the Jinn/Ginnie in "Jinnat" (Episode 46); as Pretaal in "Vikraal Aur Khauffnaak Kada" (Episode 55).
 Namrata Thapa as Nikita (Pahadi Raaja's Sister) in "Doosri Dulhan" (Episode 18); as Sonia in "Woh Kaun Thi" (Episode 14) etc. (various characters).
 Keerti Gaekwad Kelkar as Sunehri in "Rang Barse"
 Ravee Gupta as Queen Savitri / Shilpa, in "Mrityudand"; as Cateena in "Vikraal Aur Cateena Ke Keher", as Naagika in "Vikraal Aur Naagika"(Various Characters).
 Sonia Kapoor as Rani Devyani, Brahmarakshasi in "Woh Kaun Thi" (Episode 14).
 Narayani Shastri as Ruby in "Anushaasan" (Episode 45)
 Parag Tyagi as Mercury Man in "Bijli Aur Mercury Man" (Episode 123).
 Karanvir Bohra as Neeraj in "Padosi" (Episode 34).
 Shital Thakkar as Kiran in "Anushaasan" (Episode 45) / Reva in "Vikraal Aur Haunted House" (Episode 93).
Darshan Kumar as Manoj in "Vikraal Aur Kaffan" (Episode 100).
 Gaurav Chanana as Shekhar in "Dosti" (Episode 43).
 Kanika Kohli as Mona in "Anushaasan", in various characters.
 Kishwer Merchant as Payal in "Anushaasan" (Episode 45) /as Shara in "Vikraal Aur Dracula (Part-1 & 2)" (Episode 86,87) /as Shruti in "Captain and the Curse" (Episode 101)
 Anju Mahendru as Warden Sheela Anuragi in "Anushaasan" (Episode 45).
 Gaurav Chopra as Vineet in "Jaanwar" (Episode 49).
 Ketki Dave as Mangla in "Vikraal Aur Mangla Ki Mistake" (Episode 61).
 Karishma Mehta as Payal in "Vikraal Aur Betaal Ka Anth"
 Abhimanyu Singh as Aditya in "Vikraal Aur Haunted House" (Episode 93), in "Vikraal Aur Maut Ki Safaari" (Episode 121).
 Kiran Dubey as Shirley in "Vidyut" (Episode 1); as Vishaka in "Bijli Aur Vish Kanya" (Episode 118).
 Sunaina Gulia as Kitty in "Vikraal Aur Betaal"/ "Vikraal Aur Time Machine"/ "Vikraal Aur Wishing Well"
 Kunika as Mrs Malini in "Vikraal Aur Alkazam Ka Brush" to "Vikraal Aur Dracula"
 Pracheen Chauhan as anub in "Vikraal Aur Alkatzar: The Lost City" (Episode 94)
 Ritu Chaudhary as Koyena in "Vikraal Aur Alkatzar: The Lost City" (Episode 94)
 Supriya Karnik as Ghost in "Khel" (Episode 41).
 Shawar Ali as Raaja Vikram Singh in "Jungle" (Episode 21).
 Nilanjana Sharma as Radhika in "Chehra" (Episode 23).
 Anand Suryavanshi as Himanshu in "Vikraal Aur Pahadi Bungla/Bungalow".
 Vishal Kotian as Piyush in "Doosri Dulhan" (Episode 18)
 Alyy Khan as Rohan in "Chehre Pe Chehra"
 Sunil Grover as unnamed in "Vikraal Aur Zaalima Ki Khoj" (Episode 64)
 Nigaar Khan as Sarr Katika in "Vikraal Aur Soney Ka Teer" (Episode 104), Sonika in "Vikraal Aur Gabroo Ke Soney Ka Haath" (Episode 109).
 Amita Chandekar as Seema in "Jadoo" (Episode 30); Monisha in "Dosti" (Episode 43); as Bhoori Daayan in "Vikraal Aur Sarr Kata Minister Aur Bhoori Daayan" (Episode 123)
 Perizaad Zorabian as Aparna in "Ajooba" (Episode 29).
 Jaya Bhattacharya as Vastrika in "Vikraal Aur Vastrika Ke Vastra" (Episode 110); as Taantika in "Vikraal Aur Pahadi Bungla/Bungalow" (Episode 99).
 Lalit Parimoo as Jaadugar Hinnda in "Taj" (Episode 37); as Aayushmaan in "Vikraal Aur Aayushmaan Ka Darwaza" (Episode 60); as "Vikraal Aur Aayushmaan Ka Kitaab" (Episode 106).
 Sikandar Kharbanda as Jeet in "Woh Kaun Thi"; as Sameer in "Chehra" (Episode 23).
 Mazher Sayed as Abhi in "Vidyut" (Episode 1); as Ujjwal in "Captain and the Echo Cliff" (Episode 120).
 Hiten Paintal as Rohit in "Bhediya" (Episode 3). 
 Tassnim Sheikh as Barfika in "Captain Aur Barfika" (Episode 145); as Jalikaa in "Bijli Aur Jalikaa" (Episode 146); as Barfika in "Vikraal Aur Jalnath" (Episode 147).
 Nidhi Seth as Nidhi / Reet / Sheetal / Gauri (5 episodes- 2007)

Episode list

Season 1

Season 2 
{{cast listing|
Episode 1: Jauhar (Mass Self-immolation)
 Ali Merchant as Rahul
 Ravi Mahashabde as the watchman
 Anupam Bhattacharya as Karan
 Firdaus Dadi
 Roshani Shetty (Cameo)

Episode 2: Victoria No. 401
 Mona Vasu as Niharika
 Lavina Tandon as Kaveri
 Ram Awana as Vallabh Singh, a ghost

Episode 3: Waaris (The Heir)
 Mukul Dev as Kunwar Virendra Pratap Singh
 Amit Dolawat as Utkirsha
 Sunila Karambelkar as the witch
 Pradeep Kabra as the Waaris

Episode 4: Jadugar (The Wizard)
 Mohit Malik as Dev

Episode 5: Kaun Hai (Who Is There?)
 Mihir Mishra as Dr. Tarun
 Priya Ahuja

Episode 6: Junoon (Obssesion)
 Amrapali Gupta as Priya
 Firdaus Mevawala as a businessman
 Shaji Chaudhary as a bodyguard

Episode 7: Dhruvtaal
 Karan Grover as Adi
 Kunal Bakshi

Episode 8: Pahadi Daayan (The Mountainous Witch)
 Ajay Chaudhary as Priyesh
 Vicky Ahuja as Devi Singh Guha
 Vijay Ganju as Pahadi Daayan
 Jitendra Hirawat as Anees
 Maansi Jain as Shaba

Episode 9: Bhoot Bangla (Ghost Banglow)
 Romit Raj as Imraan
 Ashish Sharma as Kartik
 Shraddha Arya

Episode 10: Dasvi Dulhan (The Tenth Bride)
 Jas Arora as Thakur
 Rohit Khurana as Suryaveer
 Nikhil Roy as Joi
 Payal Singh as Karishma

Episode 11: Hostel
 Jay Pathak as Karan
 Megha Gupta as Riya
 Vicky Ahuja as Pandey
 Jitendra Hirawat
 Roshani Shetty

Episode 12: Dedh Foot Ki Dehshat (One and a Half Foot Monster)
 KK Goswami as the ghost

Episode 13: Jai Mata Ki  (Victory to the Mother Goddess)
 Amrapali Gupta as Kanishka
 Saurabh Pandey as Vishnu
 Namrata Thapa as Madhumita

Episode 14: Bhediya (The Werewolf)
 Shakti Arora as Gopi
 Mayank Anand as Madhukar
 Megha Gupta as Mahalaxmi
 Himanshu Malhotra as Raahil
 Roshani Shetty

Episode 15: Trikoni (Triangular)
 Kushal Punjabi as Rahul
 Gopal Singh as Guide

Episode 16: Rukmani Mansion
 Vijay Ganju as Professor
 Mohit Malik as Vinay Saxena
 Sunny Singh as Shailesh

Episode 17: Khooni Billi (The Murderous Cat)
 Rucha Gujarathi as Anjali
 Rohit Arora as Vikram
 Nyra Banerjee
 Rajeeta Kochhar

Episode 18: Terrace
 Ali Merchant as the inspector
 Sonica Handa as Juhi
 Pubali Sanyal as Maaya

Episode 19: Kamra No. 13 (Room No. 13)
 Kushal Punjabi as Manav
 Karishma Randhawa as Meghna
 Navina Bole as Koena, a ghost
 Shashank Sethi as Shantanu writer
 Jaanvi Sangwan as Mrs. Jassi
 Rajeeta Kochhar

 Episode 20: Tattoo Man
 Chetan Hansraj as Max
 Barkha Bisht as Tanya
 Sameer Sharma as Kavir

Episode 21: Dacait (The Bandit)
 Nirmal Pandey as Daku Thanedar Singh
 Shakti Arora as Asim Sharma
 Bhumika Girdhar as Chahat Sinha Sharma
 Anwar Fatehan as Daaku Mohar Singh
 Ajay Chaudhary as unknown
 Vicky Ahuja as the tour guide

Episode 22: Honeymoon
 Mayank Anand as Vineet
 Priya Arya as Sandhya
 Ansha Sayed as Shweta
 Nidhi Seth as Gauri
 Jignesh Joshi as Bala
 Ajaz Khan as Gulshan
 Rajeev Bhardwaj as Joy, a servant
 Jaanvi Sangwan as Putlibai
 Aastha Chaudhary as Sakshi (Cameo)

Episode 23: Chits
 Neha Marda as Pallavi
 Raj Logani as Vishal
 Sreejita De as Mona
 Nandish Sandhu as Rahul
 Abhay Bhargava as Swapnil

Episode 24: Friday the 13th
 Lalit Parimoo as Preston Uncle
 Gopal Singh as the watchman

Episode 25: Senapati (The Commander)
 Ali Merchant as Rajkumar Aditya Singh
 Jitendra Hirawat
 Vinod Kapoor as Hanumant Singh
 Sameer Sharma as Shashank

Episode 26: Naagin (Female Snake)
 Nandish Sandhu as Manav Behl

Episode 27: Meghna (something that resides within the clouds like Lightning, Thunder or Brilliance. ".)
 Chandana Sharma as Meghna
 Shakti Arora as Arun
 Praneet Bhat as the journalist

Episode 28: Chhalava (The Illusion)
 Ajay Chaudhary as Vishesh
 Mayank Anand as Robi
 Jitendra Hirawat as Jeetu
Vijay Ganju as Chhalava
 Samragyi Nema as Rani

Episode 29: Daayan Bani Dulhan (The Witch Became a Bride)
 Abir Goswami as Rashid
 Ami Trivedi as Husna
 Farida Dadi as Amma

Episode 30: Bhai (Brother)
 Mayank Anand as Anil
 Himanshu Malhotra as Nikhil
 Vinod Kapoor as Kishore

Episode 31: Khoon Bhari Aankh (The Bloody Eyes)
 Raj Logani as Sanjay Saxena
 Megha Gupta as Anaida Sanjay Saxena
 Sukirti Kandpal as Rinky
 Kunal Bakshi as the inspector
 Pankaj Kalra as the doctor

Episode 32: Ghungroo (Anklet Bells)
 Sonia Singh as Chandralekha
 Melanie Pais as Nikita Randhawa

Episode 33: Laal Rang (The Red Colour)
 Shakti Arora
 Nidhi Seth
 Sanjay Swaraj as the director
 Gopal Singh as the producer

Episode 34: Dastakhat (The Signature)
 Tarun Khanna as Neeraj
 Sonia Singh as Surbhi
Praneet Bhat as Saleem
 Roshani Shetty as Surbhi's sister

Episode 35: Jai Maa Durga (Victory to Mother Durga)
 Ali Merchant as Narendra
 Amrapali Gupta as Nandini
 Vijay Ganju as Chowkidaar
 Samragyi Nema as Sanyukta
 Sudhir Dalvi as Dhiman

Episode 36: Yakshi (Demon)
 Rahil Azam as Aryaamann
 Himanshu Malhotra as Ashwin
 Ajay Chaudhary as Arvind
 Reshma Modi as Sanjana's mother
 Farida Dadi as Dadi
 Payal Singh as Sanjana

Episode 37: Chhoona Mana Hai (It Is Forbidden to Touch)
 Rahil Azam as Aryaamann
 Sonia Singh as Viveka Sharma
 Bharat Chawda as unknown
 Praneet Bhat as unknown
 Roshani Shetty

Episode 38: Shaitani Sipahi (Soldiers of Satan)
 Rahil Azam as Aryaamann
 Priya Ahuja as Prerna Tilak

Episode 39: Shaitan Aa Raha Hai (Satan Is Coming)
 Rahil Azam as Aryaamann
 Priya Ahuja as Prerna Tilak
Sukirti Kandpal as unknown

Episode 40: Baat Ek Raat Ki (It Is the Matter of One Night)
 Ali Merchant as Karan
 Ashish Sharma as Sid
 Ravi Mahashabde as Thakur Raghvendra Singh Rathore
 Bharat Chawda as Raman

Episode 41: Saaya (The Shadow)
 Tarun Khanna as Girish Gupta
 Mona Vasu as Tavishi
 Naveen Saini as Inspector Arijit
 Samragyi Nema as Mihika Batra

Episode 42: Maut Ka Chakravyuh (Square Planning Death)
 Nirmal Pandey as Hukum: Shweta's maternal uncle
Benaf Dadachandji as Shweta
Jitendra Hirawat as Aditya
 Ansha Sayed as Karishma
 Gopal K Singh as Hukum's Servant

Episode 43: Hospital
 Shakti Arora as Inspector Rajveer
 Shama Sikander as Inspector Ronita
 Vijay Ganju as Beerman: a prisoner
 Namrata Thapa as Inspector Putul

Episode 44: Kitaab Jaadu Aur Teen Chudail (The Book, the Magic and the Three Witches)
 Sonia Singh as Mallika "Chanda" Khandelwal
 Priya Ahuja as Saloni
 Samragyi Nema as Raayma Khandelwal
 Sushma Prashant as Dai
 Pankaj Kalra as Professor

Episode 45: Khooni Kuan (Who Is the Murderer?)
 Ali Merchant as Mohit
 Melanie Pais as Kirti Sisodiya

Episode 46: Shiva
 Indira Krishnan as Gayatri
 Sukirti Kandpal as unknown

Episode 47: Intiqaam (The Revenge)
 Mukul Dev as Professor Virendra
 Nidhi Seth as Reet
 Ram Awana as Shankar Rana
 Bharat Kapoor as ACP Kulkarni
 Praneet Bhat as Anand

Episode 48: Deewar (wall)
 Chandana Sharma as Supriya
 Vineeta Malik as Maa
 Girish Jain as Ranveer
 Jasveer Kaur as Sameera
 Sukirti Kandpal as Sumi

Episode 49: Chhupa Chhupi (Hide and Seek)
 Shashi Sharma as Mrs. Wilson: a ghost
 Alok Narula as Yash
 Vijay Ganju as Kaka

Episode 50: Suhagraat (The Wedding Night)
 Mohit Malik as Aamir
 Melanie Pais as Saira
 Jaya Binju as Rukhsaar
 Vinod Kapoor as Sarfaraz
 Manish Khanna as Jamal

Episode 51: Maut Ki Ginti (Countdown till Death)
 Alok Narula as Krish
 Ankita Shrivastava as Dr. Priyanka
 Girish Jain as AliEpisode 52: Karvachauth (Earthen Pot forth)
 Ali Merchant as Sandeep
 Melanie Pais as Gayatri
 Vineeta Malik as Dadi
 Manasvi Vyas as MonikaEpisode 53: Ek Bhoot Ek Wakil Ek Shaitan (A Ghost, a Lawyer and a Devil)
 Abir Goswami as Amar Sharma: a lawyer
 Ridheema Tiwari as Trisha
 Piku Sharma as Sunaina: a secretary
 Pankaj Kalra as Major Ripudaman Singh: A former Army officer, who is now a ghostEpisode 54: Grahpravesh (Home Entry)
 Melanie Pais as Riya
 Jeetu Malkani as Sunny
 Neena Cheema as Riya and Sunny's maternal grandmother
 Anant Jog as Riya and Sunny's father
 Neha Bam as Riya and Sunny's mother
 Payal Singh as Ghost BusterEpisode 55: Karkhana (The Factory)
 Gaurav Khanna as Ritesh
 Bhuvnesh Mann as ShahidEpisode 56: Johnny Joker (Johnny the Joker)
 Priya Ahuja as Supriya
 Girish Jain as Rohit: Supriya's brother
 Jeetu Malkani as AmrishEpisode 57: Gaadi Mat Rokna (Do Not Stop the Car)
 Abir Goswami as Shreekant
 Gayatri Choudhari as Sunita
 Jaya Binju as Paromita: a ghost
 Shakti Arora as Nikhil
 Vijay Ganju as Baba AbhiraajEpisode 58–59: Souten (Co-Wife [or] Husband's other wife)
 Bhuvnesh Mann as Ranveer
 Rucha Gujarathi as Kavita
 Anant Jog as Pandit
 Gargi Patel as Sharda: Ranveer's motherEpisode 60–61: Nayi Maa (The New Mother)
 Reema Vohra as Mamta: Naresh's daughter
 Anmol Singh as Renu: Mamta's friend
 Vinod Kapoor as Naresh
 Sunita Sengupta as Uma: Naresh's second wife
 Utkarsha Naik as Lata: a ghost
 Vineeta Malik as Laxmi
 Shivani Gosain as Meena
 Neena Cheema as Durga: Shailesh's mother (cameo)Episode 62–63: Purana Mandir (The Old Temple)
 Kushal Punjabi as Major Amar
 Chhavi Mittal as Sanjana
 Shakti Arora as Aditya
 Vicky Ahuja as D.K.
 Ashwin Kaushal as SinghaniaEpisode 64–65: Chakravyuh (plotting for a particular situation which can be controlled by the person who is creating.)
 Karan V Grover as Rachit
 Melanie Pais as Geeta
 Avika Gor as Anonymous girl
 Roshani Shetty as Teena
 Manish Naggdev as Rony
 Raju Shrestha as Charlie SirEpisode 66–67: Mannmohini ( Girl who wins the heart)
 Mukul Dev as Suraj Pratap Singh
 Tina Parekh as Mohini
 Kunal Bakshi as Mangat
 Veena Kapoor as Dai MaaEpisode 68–69: Manoranjan (The Entertainment)
 Hrishikesh Pandey as Brijesh
 Amrapali Gupta as Radha
 Himani Shivpuri as Savitri
 Anant Jog as Narayan
 Somesh Agarwal as Villager
 Rajendra Chawla as JagmohanEpisode 70–71: Satwan Dulha (Seventh Bride)
 Shaleen Bhanot as Rajveer, and as Raj Malhotra, Rajveer's reincarnated form.
 Malini Kapoor as Chandrika
 Chandana Sharma as Vibha, and as Uma, Vibha's reincarnated form.
 Payal Singh as Tantrika
 Varun Sethi as Karan: Uma's boyfriend
 Shamikh Abbas as Karan's friend
 Shankar MishraEpisode 72–73: Do Gaz Zameen Ke Neeche 	(Two Yards Under the Ground)
 Nikhil Arya as Yash Goel
 Umang Jain as Kanchan Goel
 Manish Khanna as Shreekant Goel: Yash and Kanchan's father
 Shivani Gosain as Sneha Shreekant Goel: Yash and Kanchan's mother
 Jignesh Mehta as Rahul
 Raju Shrestha as Sadashiv "Sada Kaka"
 Vinod Kapoor as Pandit Dinanath
 Anwar Fatehan as Khoka BabaEpisode 74–75: Goh Peeche Mat Dekhna (Goh: Do Not Look Behind)
 KK Goswami as Goh
 Tarun Khanna as Kunwar Vijay Pratap Singh, and as Jay Pratap Singh, Kunwar's son (also known as Ankur)
 Abhinav Kohli
 Puneet Sachdev as Ankur (also known as Jay)
 Melanie Pais as Devyani
 Sheetal Dabholkar as Riya
 Shamikh Abbas as Raju: Jay's friend (Blind boy)
 Lata Shukla as Ramdeen's wifeEpisode 76–77: Maa Ka Imtihaan (Examination of the Mother Goddess )
 Mamik Singh as Veer Pratap Singh
 Kruttika Desai as Mansi Veer Pratap Singh
 Shakti Arora as Ranveer
 Abhinav Kohli
 Reema Vohra as Amrita
 Utkarsha Naik as Veer Pratap's sisterEpisode 78–79: Darinda (The Demon)
 Ridheema Tiwari as Neetu
 Ashwin Kaushal as Tribal
 Manish Naggdev as Tendua
 Manoj Biddvai as Raj
 Abhinav KohliEpisode 80–81: Tumhari Muraad Mera Mureed (your wish my lover)
 Ayaz Khan as Rahil Rizvi
 Neha Devi Singh as Unknown
 Farida Dadi as Amma
 Payal Singh as Sakeena
 Raju Shrestha as Sheru
 Kaushal Kapoor as Bade Abbu
 Mithilesh Chaturvedi as Nisar MamuEpisode 82–83: Jai Shree Krishna (victory to lord krishna)
 Mukul Dev as Kunwar Digvijay Singh
 Aditya Kapadia as Vijay
 Raj Premi as Mayur
 Jignesh Mehta as Kaanti
 Mangala Kenkre as Maharani Gayatri
 Rajendra Chawla as Kaanti's father
 Anant Jog as Birju
 Imran Khan as Lord Krishna (cameo)Episode 84–85: Maa Sherawali (Goddess Sherawali)
 Rucha Gujarathi as Anu
 Varun Sethi as Aditya
 Vinod Kapoor as Maheshwar Prasad
 Tarakesh Chauhan as Guruji
 Harsh Vashisht as Dushyant
 Utkarsha Naik as Vishika
 Veena Kapoor as Dai Maa
 Jaanvi Sangwan as Maa SherawaliEpisode 86–87: Aao Sakhi Holi Khelen (Come companion let's play holi)
 Sonia Singh as Trishna
 Kshitee Jog as Neela
 Puneet Sachdev as Vikram
 Jeetu Malkani as Pratham
 Parull Chaudhry as Ritu: Vikram's sister
 Vineeta Malik as Karunamayi Maa
 Gargi Patel as Gayatri: Neela's mother
 Meenakshi Verma as Vikram's motherEpisode 88–89: Balighat Ka Bargad (Ballyghat's Banyan)
 Rushad Rana as Aniket 
 Nandini Singh as Nandini
 Adi Irani as Bankim Daa
 Abhimanyu Singh as Partho: Aniket's cousinEpisode 90–91: Bhabhi (The Sister-in-law)
 Priyamvada Sawant as Chhaya
 Nikhil Arya as Aditya
 Kishwer Merchant as Aarti
 Kanika Kalra as Manisha
 Neha Bam as Manisha and Aashutosh's mother
 Shankar Mishra as Manisha and Aashutosh's father
 NilouferEpisode 92–93: Yugaantar (Epoch)
 Sudhanshu Pandey as Virat: a vampire
 Ridheema Tiwari as Vedika: a vampire
 Shruti Ulfat as Maaya and Nandini, Maaya's reincarnated form: a vampire
 Umang Jain as Gehna: Nandini's daughter
 Anmol Singh as Kaveri: Gehna's friend
 Veena Kapoor as Bijli Amma
 Reshama Modi as Rajmata
 Shankar Mishra as Pranay SinghEpisode 94–95: Maa (Mother)
 Tuhina Vohra as Sumitra
 Manish Naggdev as Yash
 Kanika Kalra as Pallavi
 Kruttika Desai as Madhavi: a ghost
 Rajeeta Kochhar as MaasaEpisode 96–97: Divyaastra (The Celestial Weapon)
 Gaurav Khanna as Virendra
 Chhavi Mittal as Sunaina
 Raju Shrestha as Rajkumar
 Vijay Ganju as Purohit
 Jeetu Malkani as PuneetEpisode 98–99: Devdasi (a dancing girl and courtesan of a Hindu temple.)
 Neetha Shetty as Meera
 Malini Kapoor as Raano
 Ashish Sharma as Kanha
 Vicky Ahuja as Meera's uncleEpisode 100–101: Ravan Raj (power holder king)
 Nikhil Arya as Shrey
 Nandini Singh as Shweta
 Avinash Mukherjee as Aashu
 Raj Premi as Dharmacharya
 Tuhina Vohra as Shrey's mother
 Rinku Worah as Ekta: Shrey's sister
 Abhinav Kohli as Randeep: Ekta's husbandEpisode 102–103: Vakra Viraal Mala (crooked powerful string of prayer beads)
 Puneet Sachdev as Ayush
 Neetha Shetty as YaminiEpisode 104–105: Parchhaee (Shadow)
 Shaleen Bhanot as Rohan / Sameer
 Twinkle Bajpai as Sandhya
 Shamikh Abbas as Rohan's friend
 Parull Chaudhry as PreetiEpisode 106–107: Virasat (Inheritence)
 Mihir Mishra as Rana Varun Pratap Singh
 Mrinal Deshraj as Kajri Varun Pratap Singh
 Shakti Arora as Arjun Pratap Singh
 Vicky Ahuja as Nahar Singh
 Reshma Modi as TakshaEpisode 108–109: Kumbharakha (Pitch-Eared)
 Jeetu Malkani as Anish
 Jignesh Mehta as Mateen
 Adi Irani as Purohit
 Shivani Gosain as Drashti: Anish's mother
 Meenakshi Verma as Drashti's mother
 Raju Shrestha as AstrologerEpisode 110–111: Tum Meri Ho (You are mine)
 Twinkle Bajpai as Meghana
 Puneet Vashist as RahulEpisode 112–113: Saaye Ki Dehshat (Ghostly Shadow)
 Gaurav Khanna
Shakti Arora as Abhishek
Nidhi Seth as NidhiEpisode 114–115: Vetaal Ki Waapsi (Troll's return)
 Ashish Sharma as Aditya
 Ram Awana as Vetaal
 Shivani Gosain as Maansi
 Meenakshi Verma as Aditya' grandmother
 Dinesh Kaushik as Aditya's grandfatherEpisode 116–117: Amrauli Ke Darinde (Demon of the Suburb)
 Naman Shaw as Arjun
 Natasha Sharma as Rashmi
 Shamikh Abbas as Shaleen
 Manish Naggdev as Sameer
 Jaanvi Sangwan as Arjun's mother
 Vijay Ganju as Sameer's fatherEpisode 118–119: Khoon Ka Badla Khoon (Murder's Revenge will be murder) 
 Nirmal Pandey as Mrityunjay
 Nandish Sandhu as Shiv
 Manish Khanna as Pankaj ChopraEpisode 120–121: Raaz Ki Ek Raat (Secret of a Night)
 Rushad Rana as Varun
 Malini Kapoor as Simran
 Ridheema Tiwari
 Dinesh Kaushik as Father of ChurchEpisode 122–123: Khooni Saaya (Bloody Shadow)
Manish Paul as Prem
Lavina Tandon as Preeti
 Veena Kapoor as Prem's mother
 Ashwin Kaushal as Mr. ChawalaEpisode 124–125: Khooni Aankade (bloody figures)

 Raju Shrestha as Madan
 Vicky Ahuja as Raman
 Puneet Sachdev as Tarun
 Priyamvada Sawant as Rukmani
 Shamikh AbbasEpisode 126–127: Bhatakti Aatmayien (Wandering Souls)
 Vineet Raina as Dr. Gaurav Sharma
 Mahhi Vij as Manisha Desai
 Alok Narula as unknown
 Abhinav Kohli as Dheeraj
 Madhuri Sanjeev as Mrs. SharmaEpisode 128–129: Abhinetri (Actress)
 Jaanvi Sangwan as Urmila
 Abhinav Kohli
 Pubali Sanyal as AprajitaEpisode 130–131: Khooni Daftar( Bloody office)
 Neha Devi Singh as Shalini
 Raju Shrestha as Raghav
 Shamikh Abbas as BabuEpisode 132–133: Woh Kaun Thi ( who was she)Episode 134–135: Guest House Manish Paul
 KK Goswami as Zurawar
 Tanya Abrol
 Alok Narula as BalvinderEpisode 136–137: Khaufnaak Raaz (creepy secrets)
 Payal Nair as Jyoti
 Ashok Lokhande as Inspector A. NitoreEpisode 138–139: Tasveer (picture)
 Puneet Vashisht as Amrit
 Nandini Singh as MasoomEpisode 140 – 141: Didi (Elder Sister)
 Shreejita de as Urjaa
 Nishigandha Wad as Urja's motherEpisode 142 – 143: Pehli Aulaad (First Child)
 Ajay Chaudhary
 Roshani ShettyEpisode 144–145: Ek Aam Aadmi (One common man)
 Tushar Dalvi as Kedar
 Tuhina Vohra as Sneha: Kedar's wife
 Manish Arora as Khan SahabEpisode 146–147: Shaitan Ka Shikanja(devil's screws)
 Puneet Sachdev as Deepak
 Manava Naik as Khushi
 Amit BehlEpisode 148–149: Aadamkhor Bhedia (Canibal werewolf)• Chandana SharmaEpisode 150–151: Police StationEpisode 152–153: Kaali Chudail (black witch)
 Rashami Desai as Priya
 Kanika Kalra as Shalini
 Manish Paul as Prashant
 Kunal Bakshi as Sameer
 Shankar Mishra as ProfessorEpisode 154-155 : Andhera (dark)
 Kushaal Punjabi
 Raju Shresta as InspectorEpisode 156–157: Aaina (Mirror)
 Nikhil Arya as Shreekant
 Chhavi Mittal as UrmilaEpisode 158–165: Vallabhgarh Ki Rajkumari(princess of vallabhgarh)
 Suhasi Dhami as Kalyani
 Alyy Khan as Ajinkya
 Abhimanyu Singh as Inspector Jhujjar Singh
 Vicky AhujaEpisode 166–173: Qayamat (Doom)
 Gaurav Chopra as Yuvraaj
 Twinkle Bajpai as Priyanka
 Tarun Khanna as SP Arjun Mehra
 Raju Shrestha as Damroo
 Jay PathakEpisode 174–175: Honeymoon Hotel Manish Paul as Raj
 Nandini Singh as Simran
 Kurush Deboo as Cyrus batilwala
 Reshma Modi as Cyrus batilwala's wife
Alok NarulaEpisode 176–177: Kaala Dongar (Black mountain)
 Kushal Punjabi as DhruvEpisode 178–179: Paalna (Nourish)
 Rucha Gujarathi as NandiniEpisode 180–181: Anamika (No name)
 Aastha ChaudharyEpisode 182–183: Danav Dasi(Demon maid)
 Megha Gupta as Devaki
Shankar Mishra as Devaki's FatherEpisode 184 – 185 : Antim Baali (Final Seed)• Ram AwanaEpisode 186–187: Bidaai (goodbye)
 Gautam Rode as Inspector Aditya More
 Vicky Ahuja as Inspector Sawant
 Anmol DhimanEpisode 188–189: Thakur Ki Dulhan (Thakur's bride)
 Mukul Dev as Thakur Virendra Pratap Singh
 Amrapali Gupta as Devyani
 Rajeeta KochharEpisode 190–191: Shikaar(hunting)
 Harsh VashishtEpisode 192-193: Seedhi Savitri(Directly Savitiri)
 Ali Merchant as Satya
 Praneet Bhatt as DJ
 Shreejita de as SavitriEpisode 194–201: Nishaan(Mark)
 Mukesh Khanna as Panini (Guruji)
 Eijaz Khan as Virat Saniyal
 Aastha Chaudhary as Uttara Virat Saniyal
 Diwakar Pundir as Varisht Saniyal
 Indira Krishnan as Mridula Varisht Saniyal
 Manasvi Vyas as Virat's sister
 Ashwin Kaushal as Uttara's father
 Pratap Sachdev
 Hemant Choudhary as Prabal
 Vicky Ahuja as MamaJi
 Rajeeta Kochhar
 Amit Behl as Chief MinisterEpisode 202–209: Drishti(vision)
 Rucha Gujarathi as Aditi
 Shakti Anand as Dr. Ashish / Nitin Kapoor
 Praneet Bhatt as Aditi's friendEpisode 210–221: Intezaar'(Wait)
 Gautam Rode as Thakur Mohan Singh / Madhav Sharma
 Divyanka Tripathi as Radhika / Meera
 Amrapali Gupta as Ambika / Kalika
 Raj Premi as Radhika's father
 Utkarsha Naik as Thakurain Manjari Ujjwal Singh
 Rituraj Singh as unknown
 Siddharth Vasudev as Radhika's brother
 Vicky Ahuja as Pradeep Das Gupta
 Kishan Bhan as Madhav's driver
 Pradeep Kabra
}}

Season 3 – Tritiya
 Gauri Tonk as Vayika (witch)
 Sandeep Rajora as Saarthak
 Naman Shaw as Ajinkya
 Ashish Kapoor as Veer
 Murli Sharma as Vikrant
 Mouni Roy as Koena
 Anupriya Kapoor as Shalvari

Accolades

Roy Baretto won the Indian Telly Award for Best TV Show Packaging in 2002 and 2003, while Hiroo Keswani won for Videography (Best TV Cameraman – Fiction) in 2004. Cinevistaas Limited won the Indian Telly Jury Award for Best Special/Visual Effects for television in 2002 and 2003, and Contiloe Entertainment was nominated in 2009.

Cinevistaas Limited also won the Indian Television Academy Award for Best Visual Effects in 2001, while Contiloe Entertainment won for Best Thriller / Horror Serial in 2007 and for Best Thriller Programme in 2008 and 2009.

Spin-off
Vikraal Aur Gabraal

A spin-off series Vikraal Aur Gabraal'' ran from 27 July 2003 to 23 May 2004 on Star Plus. The series centers around Vikraal, a ghost hunter teaching his apprentice "Gabroo", who is passionate and ambitious to become a ghost hunter himself going by the name of Gabraal. The spin-off series had a common plot wherein it solved the mystery and captured the ghost at the end of Ssshhhh... Koi Hai. Later, Vikraal asks Gabroo a coin to finish off the story with his action hunt by capturing the ghost of the story. Hence Gabroo learns to capture ghosts.

The series starred KK Goswami and Mamik Singh, who was replaced by Salil Ankola, Jiten Lalwani, Neha Devi Singh in later episodes, according to the storyline change and introduction of the series Ssshhhh... Koi Hai – Trikaal.

Episode list

References

External links

Ssshhhh...Koi Hai on Hotstar

2001 Indian television series debuts
Hindi-language television shows
Television shows set in Mumbai
Indian horror fiction television series
StarPlus original programming
Star One (Indian TV channel) original programming
2010 Indian television series endings
Ghosts in television
Indian supernatural television series